Euproctis bimaculata is a moth of the family Erebidae first described by Francis Walker in 1855. It is found in India, Sri Lanka and Thailand.

The caterpillar is known to feed on Loranthus species.

References

Moths of Asia
Moths described in 1855